The Almamellék State Forest Railway is a  railway line built on the former Kaposvár-Szigetvár railway line in Hungary. It is currently operational between Almamellék and Sasrét. The Lukafa branch line was formerly regularly operated, but it is now disused.

Motive Power

References

Narrow gauge railways in Hungary